Histioteuthis is a genus of squid in the family Histioteuthidae. It goes by the common name cock-eyed squid, because in all species the right eye is normal-sized, round, blue and sunken; whereas the left eye is at least twice the diameter of the right eye, tubular, yellow-green, faces upward, and bulges out of the head.

In 2017, researchers at Duke University established that Histioteuthis uses its larger eye to see ambient sunlight, and its smaller eye to detect bioluminescence from prey animals.

The genus contains bioluminescent species.

Species
H. bonnellii species-group
Histioteuthis bonnellii, umbrella squid
Histioteuthis machrohista
H. reversa species-group
Histioteuthis eltaninae
Histioteuthis atlantica
Histioteuthis reversa, reverse jewel squid
H. celetaria subspecies-group
Histioteuthis celetaria celetaria
Histioteuthis celetaria pacifica
H. corona subspecies-group
Histioteuthis corona berryi
Histioteuthis corona cerasina
Histioteuthis corona corona
Histioteuthis corona inermis
H. miranda species-group
Histioteuthis miranda
Histioteuthis oceani
H. meleagroteuthis species-group
Histioteuthis heteropsis, strawberry squid
Histioteuthis meleagroteuthis

References

External links

Histioteuthidae discussion forum at TONMO.com

Squid
Bioluminescent molluscs